Hapton is a civil parish in the borough of Burnley, Lancashire, England.  The parish contains seven buildings that are recorded in the National Heritage List for England as designated listed buildings. Of these, one is listed at Grade I, the highest of the three grades, one at Grade II*, the middle grade, and the others are at Grade II, the lowest grade.  Apart from the village of Hapton, and some industrial encroachment from Burnley to the northeast the parish is rural. Three of the listed buildings are or have been farmhouses.  The most notable building in the parish is Shuttleworth Hall; this together with associated structures, is listed.  The Leeds and Liverpool Canal passes through the parish, and two of the bridges crossing it are listed.

Key

Buildings

References

Citations

Sources

Buildings and structures in Burnley
Lists of listed buildings in Lancashire